Jissy de Wolf (born 3 March 1972) is a Dutch rower. She competed in the women's eight event at the 1996 Summer Olympics.

References

External links
 

1972 births
Living people
Dutch female rowers
Olympic rowers of the Netherlands
Rowers at the 1996 Summer Olympics
People from Sneek
Sportspeople from Friesland